USS Pirate has been the name of more than one United States Navy ship, and may refer to:

 , a patrol vessel in commission from 1917 to 1918
 , a minesweeper in commission from 1944 to 1946 and again in 1950

See also
 , an expeditionary supply vessel that sank in 1839.

United States Navy ship names